Cynthia Minette Marten is an American educator and government official who has served as the 11th United States deputy secretary of education since May 18, 2021. Marten previously served as the superintendent of the San Diego Unified School District from 2013 until her confirmation as deputy secretary in May 2021.

Education 
Marten earned a bachelor's degree in education from the University of Wisconsin–La Crosse and master's degree in teaching and learning from the University of California, San Diego.

Career 
Marten spent 32 years as an educator, holding various roles of increasing responsibility as a teacher, literacy specialist, vice principal, and principal. For 10 years she worked at Central Elementary School in City Heights. As a teacher, instructional leader, and later as principal, she placed an emphasis on social and emotional learning and the arts, combined with academics.

In 2013, Marten became the superintendent of the San Diego Unified School District. She was succeeded by Lamont Jackson, who will remain in the role until December 2021.

Marten's nomination by Joe Biden to be deputy secretary of education was submitted to the United States Senate on February 22, 2021, and confirmed by the full United States Senate on May 11, 2021, by a vote of 54–44.

Selected works

References 

Living people
Place of birth missing (living people)
Date of birth missing (living people)
21st-century American educators
21st-century American women educators
Biden administration personnel
Schoolteachers from California
United States Deputy Secretaries of Education
University of California, San Diego alumni
University of Wisconsin–La Crosse alumni
Year of birth missing (living people)